= Gaurean Na Mohra =

- Town
- Location within Pakistan
- Coordinates: 33.28°N 73.24°E
- Country: Pakistan
- Province: (Islamabad Capital Territory) Islamabad C.T
- Elevation: 600 m (2,000 ft)
- Time zone: UTC+5 (PST)

Gaurean Na Mohra is a town in the Islamabad Capital Territory of Pakistan. It is located at 33° 28' 10N 73° 24' 50E with an altitude of 600 metres (1971 feet).
